The Larut, Matang and Selama District is a district of Perak, Malaysia. Taiping is the capital town of this district. Larut, Matang and Selama used to be three small different districts and they merged into one larger district later. Larut, Matang and Selama houses Taiping, Perak's second largest city and former state capital. Other towns in the region include Matang, Kuala Sepetang (Port Weld) and Selama. The region borders the state of Kedah on the north, the Kerian District on the northwest, the Hulu Perak and Kuala Kangsar District on the east, and the Manjung District on the south.

History
The area has a long history dating back to the mid-1850s. The Larut War occurred around Taiping and Matang. The first railway in the Malay states was constructed here, connecting Taiping with Kuala Sepetang, formerly Port Weld. Larut, Matang and Selama is also the place where the first modern town, museum and hill station were built in Perak as Taiping was the capital of the Federated Malay States, before Kuala Lumpur took the honor.

Administrative divisions

Larut and Matang District is divided into 11 mukims (communes) and Taiping city, which are:
 Batu Kurau
 Bukit Gantang
 Matang
 Sungai Tinggi
 Trong

Larut Matang and Selama district also contains the Selama autonomous sub-district (daerah kecil) in the northern portion, covering 3 mukims which are Selama town, Hulu Selama and Ijok.

Government
Currently, Larut, Matang and Selama district is governed by two different councils which is Taiping Municipal Council for southern part of the district while the subdistrict of Selama is under its own district council.

Demographics 

The following is based on Department of Statistics Malaysia 2010 census.

Federal Parliament and State Assembly Seats 

List of Larut, Matang and Selama district representatives in the Federal Parliament (Dewan Rakyat)

List of Larut, Matang and Selama district representatives in the State Legislative Assembly

See also

 Districts of Malaysia

References